In Bosnia, the following grading scale applies to elementary and high school students:

The following applies to university students:

The entire grading scale was inherited from the Socialist Federal Republic of Yugoslavia and have the same features as Academic grading in Serbia.

References

Bosnia and Herzegovina
Grading
Grading